Paroldo is a comune (municipality) in the Province of Cuneo in the Italian region Piedmont, located about  southeast of Turin and about  east of Cuneo.

Paroldo borders the following municipalities: Ceva, Mombarcaro, Murazzano, Roascio, Sale San Giovanni, and Torresina.

Demographic evolution

References

 Paroldo: The magical Italian village that 'witches' call home  CNN Travel

Cities and towns in Piedmont
Comunità Montana Valli Mongia, Cevetta e Langa Cebana